The following is a list of notable people associated with Grand Rapids, Michigan. These people were born or lived in Grand Rapids.

Artists and artisans
 Mathias Alten — impressionist painter
 Jeffrey Brown — comic book creator
 Frederick Stuart Church — illustrator
 Paul Collins — painter
 Dirk Gringhuis — illustrator
 Daniel Vosovic — clothing designer

Business, industry, academic and labor figures

Entertainment figures

 Gillian Anderson — television and film actress
 Ford Beebe — film director
 Otto Brower — film director
 James T. Callahan — film and television actor
 Horace B. Carpenter — film actor and director
 Jim Cash — screenwriter
 Riley Chamberlin — silent film actor
 Rex Cherryman — stage and film actor
 Shawn Christian — television and film actor
 Wanda Cochran — soprano
 Steven Ford — television and film actor
 Stephen Goosson — film set designer
 Lorna Gray — film actress
 Stacey Haiduk — television actress
 Thom Hartmann — radio personality
 Paul Walter Hauser - television and film actor and comedian
 Adam Herz — screenwriter and producer
 Jimmy Jacobs — professional wrestler
 Matt Keeslar — television and film actor
 Lisa Kelly — ice road trucker
 James Kirkwood Sr. — film actor and director
 Eric Allan Kramer — television, film and stage actor
 Taylor Lautner — television and film actor
 Victor Lundberg — radio personality
 C. Cameron Macauley — filmmaker
 Violet MacMillan — vaudeville, stage and silent film actress
 Kevin Matthews — radio personality
 Ryan O'Reilly — professional wrestler
 Wally Phillips — radio personality
 Don Quinn — comedy writer and cartoonist
 Andy Richter — television and film actor
 Leonard Schrader — screenwriter and director
 Paul Schrader — screenwriter and director
 Richard Shoberg — television actor
 [[Phillips Holmes - early film actor
 Noah Sife - television actor
 Jackie Swanson — television and film actress
 Ray Teal — television and film actor
 Reed Timmer — storm chaser and meteorologist
 Jess Walton — television actress
 Elizabeth Wilson — stage, television and film actress
 Dick York — television, stage, radio and film actor
 Ginger Zee — ABC News meteorologist
 Kim Zimmer — television and stage actress

Government officials, politicians and activists

Military figures

Musicians and bands

 Pennjamin Bannekar — independent music artist and songwriter
 Ralston Bowles — folk musician
 Mary Canberg — violinist
 The Cardboard Swords — pop-rock band
 Jeffrey Daniel — member of R&B group Shalamar
 Xavier Davis — jazz pianist
 DeBarge — R&B/soul group
 Dennis "Fergie" Frederiksen — vocalist (formerly of Toto)
 Al Green — R&B/soul singer
 Bob Hay — member of the Squalls
 Adina Howard — R&B singer
 Charlie Huhn — frontman for Foghat
 Maynard James Keenan — lead singer of Tool
 Anthony Kiedis — lead singer of the Red Hot Chili Peppers
 La the Darkman — hip hop artist affiliated with Wu-Tang Clan
 La Dispute — post-hardcore group

 Robert Longfield - composer
 Kevin Max — member of dc Talk
 Ken Medema — Christian musician
 Kellin Quinn — Member of post-hardcore/alternative rock band "Sleeping With Sirens"
 John W. Peterson — Christian songwriter
 Mustard Plug — ska punk group
 Pop Evil — hard rock band
 Marvin Sapp — gospel singer, and member of the group Commissioned
 Del Shannon — rock & roll musician
 Sleeping with Sirens — alternative rock/post-hardcore band
 SoFaygo - rapper
 Leo Sowerby — composer and musician
 Still Remains — metalcore group
 Casey Stratton — pop/rock musician
 Sam Stryke — composer and pianist
 Helena Stone Torgerson — harpist and composer
 Whirlwind Heat — alternative rock group
 Willie the Kid — rapper
 Jason Wood — lead singer of It Dies Today

Religious figures

Criminals
 Gwendolyn Graham and Cathy Wood

Sports figures

Writers, novelists, poets and journalists

References

 
Grand Rapids
Grand Rapids